"Somebody Else" is a song recorded by American R&B singer-songwriter Mario, featuring guest vocals from Trinidadian-American rapper Nicki Minaj. The song was released in the United States as a digital download on May 21, 2013, on RCA Records.

It was intended to be the lead single for his then-upcoming fifth studio album, but would only be a standalone single due to Mario scrapping the whole album and departing from the label.

The record heavily samples the 1975 song "Remember the Rain", by American R&B group 21st Century.

Background
Through his official Twitter page, on May 17, 2013, he confirmed that he has been working with Polow Da Don, for the track "Somebody Else" featuring rapper Nicki Minaj. R&B singer-songwriter Frank Ocean recorded a demo of the song as did Chris Brown who considered the song for his album Fortune.

Composition
"Somebody Else" was written by Mario and Nicki Minaj, and it was produced by Polow da Don. The song is an upbeat tempo track featuring thumbing percussion, with hip-hop influences and sampled vocals in the hook.

Critical reception 
"Somebody Else" was praised by R&B music critics, many of them adored Minaj's verse. Critics also commented that people may love or hate this song, because of the meaning of it: "getting dumped and watching the man or woman you love run straight into the arms of 'Somebody Else'." RnB Magazine called it "hot music" and a summer hit. ThisisRnB.com acclaimed Minaj's verse and Polow Da Don's production, calling those "impressive" and "infectious", respectively.

Music video
The video was filmed on May 25, 2013 and directed by Alexandre Moors. The video premiered on July 8, 2013 on MTV Jams and it was premiered on July 10, 2013 on BET's 106 & Park. The video chronicles the dramatic ending of a relationship as Mario and Nicki square off in the video.

Track listing
Digital download
"Somebody Else" (featuring Nicki Minaj) - 4:09

Chart performance

Release history

References

2013 singles
2013 songs
Mario (singer) songs
Nicki Minaj songs
RCA Records singles
Songs written by Polow da Don
Songs written by Nicki Minaj
Songs written by Mario (American singer)
Song recordings produced by Polow da Don
Songs about heartache
Contemporary R&B ballads